Shush County is in Khuzestan province, Iran. The capital of the county is the city of Shush. At the 2006 census, the county's population was 189,793 in 33,313 households. The following census in 2011 counted 202,762 people in 47,304 households. At the 2016 census the county's population was 205,720, in 55,194 households. Shavur District was separated from Shush County on 16 December 2019 to become Karkheh County. The ancient city of Susa is located in Shush County.

Administrative divisions

The population history and structural changes of Shush County's administrative divisions over three consecutive censuses are shown in the following table. The latest census shows three districts, seven rural districts, and five cities.

References

External links 
 Hamid-Reza Hosseini, Shush at the foot of Louvre (Shush dar dāman-e Louvre), in Persian, Jadid Online, 10 March 2009, .
 Audio slideshow:  (6 min 31 sec).

 

Counties of Khuzestan Province